2-Pinanol is a collection of bicyclic terpenoid derived from the terpene pinene, but containing a tertiary alcohol. Both cis and trans isomers exist.  Both are chiral They are produced by deoxygenation of corresponding cis- and trans-2-pinane hydroperoxide, which in turn can be produced by autoxidation of pinane with air.  Heating 2-pinanol gives linalool.

References

Monoterpenes
Cyclobutanes
Cyclohexanes